Member states of the European Union use various forms of democracy. The European Union (EU) is a sui generis supranational union of  states. At a European Council Summit held in Copenhagen, Denmark, on 21 June and 22 June 1993, the European Union defined the Copenhagen criteria regarding the conditions a candidate country has to fulfill to be considered eligible for accession to the European Union:

Consequently, all member states have direct elections, nominally democratic states that are considered to be "free" or "partly free" according to the criteria of Freedom House. As of 2020, there is no expert consensus on how to classify Hungary's regime type; Freedom House considers it a hybrid regime. As of 2015, all European Union member states are representative democracies; however, they do not all have the same political system, with most of the differences arising from different historical backgrounds.

Many of the states in the neighbourhood of the European Union are not considered to be "free" by the same criteria. Most European states neighbouring the European Union are considered to be "free" or "partly free" by Freedom House, with the exceptions of Azerbaijan, Belarus and Russia. On the other hand, almost all of the states in North Africa and Southwest Asia that neighbour the European Union are not considered to be "free", with the exceptions of Israel and Tunisia.

Monarchism and republicanism

At present, there are twelve monarchies in Europe, of which six are members of the European Union: Belgium, Denmark, Luxembourg, the Netherlands, Spain and Sweden, and six are not: Andorra, Liechtenstein, Monaco, Norway, the United Kingdom and the Vatican City. All six monarchies in the European Union are constitutional monarchies. In all six monarchies that are in the EU, the monarch is legally prohibited from using political power, or the monarch does not utilise the political powers vested in the office by convention. At the dawn of the 20th century, France was the only republic among the future members states of the European Union; the ascent of republicanism to the political mainstream only started at the beginning of the 20th century. In Belgium, the monarchy enjoys a lower degree of support than in other European monarchies, and is often questioned. Popular support for the monarchy has historically been higher in Flanders and lower in Wallonia; however, in recent decades these roles have reversed.

Form of government

There are three types of government systems in European politics: in a presidential system, the president is the head of state and the head of government; in a semi-presidential system, the president and the prime minister share a number of competences; finally, in a parliamentary republic, the president is a ceremonial figurehead who has few political competences. As with the definition of constitutional monarchies, sometimes the president does have non-ceremonial competences, but does not use them by constitutional convention; this is the case in Austria, for instance.

By definition, modern democratic constitutional monarchies are parliamentary, as there is no elected head of state who could assume non-ceremonial competences; of the twenty one republican member states of the European Union, only one is a presidential republic (Cyprus) and four are semi-presidential republics (France, Lithuania, Portugal and Romania). These four (semi-)presidential republics elect their president by direct popular vote. Among the sixteen parliamentary republics, nine do the same (namely Austria, Bulgaria, Croatia, Czech Republic, Finland, Ireland, Poland, Slovakia and Slovenia), whereas in the remaining seven (Estonia, Germany, Greece, Hungary, Italy, Latvia and Malta), the president is elected by parliament or other special representative body such as the German Bundesversammlung.

Degree of self-governance

Most of the European Union's member states are unitary states, which means that most of the competences lie with the central government and only minor or local issues are within the authority of regional governments. However, three states are federations (Austria, Belgium and Germany) of states or regions with equal competences, and six other states have either devolved certain powers to special regions or are federacies (or both):
 federacies:
 in Denmark, the Faroe Islands and Greenland are autonomous (and neither is part of the European Union);
 in Finland, Åland has substantial autonomy;
 in France, the collectivité sui generis New Caledonia (which is not part of the European Union) has a large degree of autonomy;
 in the Netherlands, the Caribbean island groups of Aruba, Curaçao and Sint Maarten are equal partners to the Netherlands within the Kingdom of the Netherlands;
 devolved states:
 in Italy, the government has devolved a number of powers to the twenty regions, of which five have a very large degree of autonomy;
 in Spain, the central government has devolved various powers to the historic nationalities among the autonomous communities, namely Andalusia, the Basque Country, Catalonia and Galicia.

Parliamentary chambers

A further distinction is the number of chambers in the national legislature; unicameral systems with one chamber or bicameral ones with a lower house and an upper house. Federations and countries with strong regional differences or regional identities are normally bicameral, to reflect the regions' interests in national bills. The states with the larger populations, from the Netherlands upwards, all have a bicameral system. Although there is a greater mix among the smaller states (some influenced by their federalist structure), the smallest states are on the whole unicameral.

While there had been legislatures with more than two chambers (tricameral and tetracameral ones), nowadays there are only unicameral and bicameral ones. Additionally, there are also differences in the degree of bicameralism. Whereas Italy is considered as having "perfect bicameralism", with both chambers being equal, most other bicameral systems restrict the upper house's powers to a certain extent. There is a slight trend towards unicameralism; some upper houses have seen their powers reduced or proposals to that end. Belgium's system has been reduced from a perfectly bicameral one to a nowadays de facto unicameral system. On the other hand, Ireland narrowly voted against abolishing their upper house in 2013, and Italy voted not to reduce its Senate's powers in 2016.

In the member states of the European Union, if the parliament has only one chamber, it is wholly directly elected in all cases. If there are two chambers, the lower house is directly elected in all cases, while the upper house can be directly elected (e.g. the Senate of Poland); or indirectly elected, for example, by regional legislatures (e.g. the Federal Council of Austria); or non-elected, but representing certain interest groups (e.g. the National Council of Slovenia).

Listed by form of government

Listed by type of parliament

I: Due to Belgium's complex federal structure the Parliament of the Brussels-Capital Region (Brussels Hoofdstedelijk Parlement / Parlement de la Région de Bruxelles-Capitale) (89, regional assembly), Flemish Parliament (Vlaams Parlement) (124, regional and community assembly), the Walloon Parliament (Parlement wallon) (75, regional assembly), the Parliament of the French Community (Parlement de la Communauté française) (94, community assembly) and the Parliament of the German-speaking Community (Parlament der Deutschsprachigen Gemeinschaft) (25, community assembly) have competences in federal legislation that affects their interests.
II: Only 56 out of 80 are occupied, due to the occupation of Cyprus.
III: In legislation which affects the autonomous region of Åland, its Parliament (Lagting) (30) also has legislative competences.
IV: While there is a Federal Assembly similar to the Austrian Federal Assembly, it is not simply a joint session of the Federal Diet and the Federal Council and as such not the overall name of the legislature.
V: Technically, the Federal Diet only has 598 seats; the additional thirty-two members are overhang seats resulting from the 2017 election.
VI: The Irish names are used in the English-language version of the Constitution of Ireland, and generally in English-language speech and writing in Ireland.
VII: In addition to the 315 elected members, there are currently five senators for life; these include former Italian President, who is  senator for life, as well as senators appointed by the President "for outstanding patriotic merits in the social, scientific, artistic or literary field". There can only be five appointed senators in addition to the  ones at any one time.
VIII: Technically, the House of Representatives only has 65 members; the additional two seats are overhang seats to ensure a majority of MPs for the party which gained the most votes in the 2017 election.
IX: The name Zgromadzenie Narodowe is only used on the rare occasions when both houses sit together.

See also
List of political systems in France

References

 Political System
European Union-related lists
Political systems